

Prehistoric times

 2.5-1.8 million years ago: The discovery of the use of fire and the sharing of the benefits of the use of fire may have created a sense of sharing as a group. Earliest estimate for invention of cooking, by phylogenetic analysis.
 2 to 5 million years ago: Hominids shift away from the consumption of nuts and berries to begin the consumption of meat.
 250,000 years ago: Hearths appear, accepted archeological estimate for invention of cooking.
 170,000 years ago: Cooked starchy roots and tubers in Africa
 40,000 years ago: First evidence of human fish consumption: isotopic analysis of the skeletal remains of Tianyuan man, a modern human from eastern Asia, has shown that he regularly consumed freshwater fish.
 30,000 years ago: Earliest archaeological evidence for flour, which was likely processed into an unleavened bread, dates to the Upper Palaeolithic in Europe.
 25,000 years ago: The fish-gorge, a kind of fish hook, appears.
 13,000 BCE: Contentious evidence of oldest domesticated rice in Korea. Their 15,000-year age challenges the accepted view that rice cultivation originated in China about 12,000 years ago. These findings were received by academia with strong skepticism, and the results and their publicizing has been cited as being driven by a combination of nationalist and regional interests.
 11,500 - 6200 BCE: Genetic evidence published in the Proceedings of the National Academy of Sciences of the United States of America (PNAS) shows that all forms of Asian rice, both indica and japonica, spring from a single domestication that occurred 8,200–13,500 years ago in China of the wild rice Oryza rufipogon.

Neolithic

 ~9300 BCE: Figs cultivated in the Jordan Valley
 ~8000 BCE: Squash was grown in Mexico
 8000-5000 BCE: Archaeological and palaeoenvironmental evidence of banana cultivation at Kuk Swamp in the Western Highlands Province of Papua New Guinea.
 8000-5000 BCE: Earliest domestication of potato in the neighbourhood of Lake Titicaca.
 ~8000 BCE: Wild olives were collected by Neolithic peoples
 ~7000 BCE: Cereal (grain) production in Syria
 ~7000 BCE: Farmers in China began to farm rice and millet, using man-made floods and fires as part of their cultivation regimen. 
 ~7000 BCE: Maize-like plants, derived from the wild teosinte, began to be seen in Mexico.
 ~7000 BCE: Chinese villagers were brewing fermented alcoholic drinks on small and individual scale, with the production process and methods similar to that of ancient Egypt and Mesopotamia.
 ~7000 BCE: Sheep, originating from western Asia, were domesticated with the help of dogs prior to the establishment of settled agriculture,
 6570-4530 BCE: Earliest and controversial estimation of rice cultivation in India.
 6140-4550 BCE: Archaeological evidence of fish processing and long-term storage, at the Atlit-Yam site, in what is now Israel.
 ~6000 BCE: Grapes were first grown for wine in the Southern Caucasus.
 ~5500 BCE: Earliest secure evidence of cheesemaking in Kujawy, Poland.
 ~5000 BCE: Cattle were domesticated in Mesopotamia after settled agriculture was established
 ~5000 BCE: Modern-like maize varieties appear.
 ~5000 BCE: Beans begin to be cultivated in the Americas 
 ~5000 BCE: Fossilized remains of possibly cultivated potato tubers on a cave floor in Chilca Canyon.

4000-1 BCE

 Earliest archaeological evidence for leavened bread is from ancient Egypt. The extent to which bread was leavened in ancient Egypt remains uncertain.
 4500-3500 BCE: Earliest clear evidence of olive domestication and olive oil extraction
 ~4000 BCE: Watermelon, originally domesticated in central Africa, becomes an important crop in northern Africa and southwestern Asia.
 ~4000 BCE: Agriculture reaches north-eastern Europe.
 ~4000 BCE: Dairy is documented in the grasslands of the Sahara.
 4000 BCE: Citron seeds in Mesopotamian excavations.
 ~3900 BCE: In Mesopotamia (Ancient Iraq), early evidence of beer is a Sumerian poem honoring Ninkasi, the patron goddess of brewing, which contains the oldest surviving beer recipe, describing the production of beer from barley via bread.
 ~3500 BCE: Beer produced in what is today Iran.
 ~3500 BCE: Aquaculture starts in China with the farming of the common carp.
 ~3500-3000 BCE: Several breeds of sheep were established in ancient Mesopotamia and Egypt
 ~3000 BCE: Palm oil found in a tomb in Abydos.
 ~3000 BCE: Grape cultivation for wine had spread to the Fertile Crescent, the Jordan Valley and Egypt.
 ~3000 BCE: Sunflowers are first cultivated in North America.
 ~3000 BCE: South America's Andes region cultivates potato.
 ~3000 BCE: Archaeological evidence of watermelon cultivation in ancient Egypt. Watermelons appeared on wall paintings; seeds and leaves were deposited in tombs.
 ~3000 BCE: Beer was spread through Europe by Germanic and Celtic tribes
 ~3000 BCE: Two alabaster jars found at Saqqara, dating from the First Dynasty of Egypt, contained cheese. These were placed in the tomb about 3000 BC.
 ~2500 BCE: Domestic pigs, which are descended from wild boars, are known to have existed about 2500 BC in modern-day Hungary and in Troy; earlier pottery from Jericho and Egypt depicts wild pigs.
 ~2500 BCE: Pearl millet was domesticated in the Sahel region of West Africa, evidence for the cultivation of pearl millet in Mali. 
 2500-1500 BCE: Time range of several sites with archaeological evidence of potato being consumed and cultivated in the South American continent.
 2000-1500 BCE: Rice cultivation in the upper and middle Ganges begins.
 ~2000 BCE: Visual evidence of Egyptian cheesemaking found in Egyptian tomb murals.
 ~1900 BCE: Evidence for cheese (GA.UAR) in the Sumerian cuneiform texts of Third Dynasty of Ur
 ~1900 BCE: Evidence of chocolate drinks in Mokaya and other pre-Olmec people
 ~1500 BCE: Rice cultivated in the Niger area.
 ~1100 BCE: Egyptians are able to purchase a flat (unleavened) bread called ta from stalls in the village streets.
 ~1000 BCE: Rice cultivation spreads to the Middle East and Madagascar. 
 ~1000 BCE: Lower bound for the cultivation of cucumbers in the western Asia.
 5th century BCE: Garum was used in Greek cuisine 
 ~400 BCE: Confirmed written evidence of ancient beer production in Armenia, from Xenophon's Anabasis
 327-324 BCE: Alexander the Great expedition to India brings the knowledge of rice to Romans. However rice did not enter as a cultivation: the Romans preferred to import rice wine instead. 
 ~300 BCE: Citron brought to Greece by Alexander the Great.
 ~200 BCE: Citron brought to Palestine by Greek colonists.
 1st century BCE: Horace mentions Spanish garum (Satires, II.8.46); Spain dominates the fish market.

1-1000
 8th century: The original type of sushi, known today as narezushi (馴れ寿司, 熟寿司), first developed in Southeast Asia and spread to south China, is introduced to Japan.
 8th century: Chronicles from monasteries mention Roquefort being transported across the Alps
 9th century: First record of cucumbers cultivation in France
 ~800: Cod becomes an important economic commodity in international markets. This market has lasted for more than 1,000 years, enduring the Black Death, wars and other crises, and is still an important Norwegian fish trade. 
 ~800: By this date, watermelon reaches India.
 822: First mention of hops added to beer, by the Carolingian Abbot Adalard of Corbie
 879: Gorgonzola cheese is mentioned for the first time.
 961: Watermelons, introduced by the Moorish, reported to be cultivated in Cordoba, Spain.
 997: The term "pizza" first appears "in a Latin text from the southern Italian town of Gaeta [...], which claims that a tenant of certain property is to give the bishop of Gaeta 'duodecim pizze' ['twelve pizzas'] every Christmas Day, and another twelve every Easter Sunday".

1000-1500

11th-14th century: Ireland stores and ages butter in peat bogs, being known as bog butter. The practice is effectively ended by the 19th century.
12th century: Oldest butter export of Europe, from Scandinavia
~1100: Wafers are introduced from France into Britain, by the Normans. They were cake-like, however, not crisp like what we today call wafers. 
~1100: Watermelons reach China.
1158: Evidence of watermelons cultivated in Seville. 
14th century: First record of cucumbers cultivation in Great Britain.  
15th century: The Portuguese began fishing cod
~1450: Written records of palm oil being used as food from European travelers to West Africa.
1494: First record of cucumbers cultivation by the Spanish in Hispaniola, Caribbean islands.
15th-16th century: Rice enters the Caribbean.

16th century
1516: William IV, Duke of Bavaria, adopted the Reinheitsgebot (purity law), perhaps the oldest food-quality regulation still in use in the 21st century, according to which the only allowed ingredients of beer are water, hops and barley-malt.
1535: Spanish conquerors first see potato.
~1550: First mention of cucumbers cultivation in North America.
~1570: First potato specimens probably reach Spain.
1573: Potatoes are purchased by the Hospital de la Sangre in Seville.
1576: Watermelons cultivated in Florida by Spanish settlers.
1578: Sir Francis Drake meets potatoes in his trip around the world. However he does not bring potatoes back to Great Britain, despite common misconception.
1583-1613: Guaman Poma de Ayala writes a chronicle of the Incas where he describes and depicts potato and maize cultivation.
1585: First recorded shipment of chocolate to Europe for commercial purposes, in a shipment from Veracruz to Sevilla
1590: José de Acosta describes chuño in his chronicles.
1596: Caspar Bauhin, Swiss botanist, first describes potato scientifically in his Phytopinax, assigning it the current binomial name Solanum tuberosum. However he conjectured potatoes could cause wind and leprosy (because of a vague resemblance to leprous organs) and that they were aphrodisiac.
Before 17th century: Watermelon appears in herbals in mainland Europe, outside Spain. It also begins to spread among Native American populations.
Late 16th century-17th century: Cucumber, along with maize, beans, squash, pumpkins, and gourds are cultivated by Native Americans in what is today southern United States and, later, the region of Great Plains.

17th century
17th century: Sparkling wine first appears
~1600: William Shakespeare refers to ship biscuits in As You Like It, more resembling modern crackers.
1605: References to puff pastry, made by placing butter between sheets of rolled dough.
1605: References to rolled wafers.
1609: A trial planting in Virginia is the first cultivation of Rice in the United States.
1625: Watermelons are widespread in Europe, as a minor garden crop.
1629: First introduction of watermelons in North America, in Massachusetts.
~1650: Watermelons are now common around the New World.
1650-1765: Spreading of potato cultivation in the Netherlands.
1651: The government mandates the cultivation of potatoes in Germany.
1662: The British Royal Society sponsors the cultivation of potatoes.

18th century

18th century: Soufflé appears in France. Cakes and pastries also begin to appear, thanks to the increasing availability of sugar and the rising of the chef profession.
18th century: Pizza begins to appear in Naples.
Early 1700s: Introduction of potatoes in Russia.
~1700: Sparkling beer as we know it appears, due to maturation in bottles becoming available.
1719: Potatoes first introduced in North America: Scottish-Irish settlers bring them to New Hampshire.
1740: The harsh winter of 1740 damages many crops but not potatoes, hastening their adoption in Europe.
 1760: Egg nog was invented in North Carolina and was a common alcoholic beverage.
 1767: Soda Water was invented in Leeds, England.
1770: Potato introduced in Australasia by Captain James Cook.
1772: Antoine-Augustin Parmentier writes the treaty Examen chymique des pommes de terres, promoting the introduction of potato in France.
1774-1779: First shops selling ice cream appear in North America.
1778: Captain James Cook introduces watermelons to the Hawaii islands.
1794: Potatoes are finally firmly part of the Dutch cuisine.

19th century
Early 1800s: West African farmers began to export palm oil.
1800s: New potato varieties are brought from Chile to Europe, in an attempt to widen disease resistance of European potatoes. The import could have instead introduced or heightened vulnerability to the fungus Phytophthora infestans. 
1801: G. H. Bent Company starts producing Bent's water crackers, one of the earliest branded foods.
1802  The first modern production process for dried milk was invented by the Russian physician Osip Krichevsky in 1802. The first commercial production of dried milk was organized by the Russian chemist M. Dirchoff in 1832. In 1855, T.S. Grimwade took a patent on a dried milk procedure, though a William Newton had patented a vacuum drying process as early as 1837.
1835: Baking powder is invented.
1837: Soufflé potatoes invented by accident. 
1841: Edmond Albius, a 12-year-old slave who lived on the French island of Réunion in the Indian Ocean, discovered that vanilla could be hand-pollinated. Hand-pollination allowed global cultivation of the plant.
1843: Nancy M. Johnson invents the hand cranked freezer, credited for the fast diffusion of ice cream.
1845-1852: Potato blight infection leads to famine in Ireland, killing or forcing the emigration of 1.5 million Irish people.
1867: Charles Feltman invented the hot dog in his stall in Coney Island, New York by pairing a frankfurter with a bread bun.
1869: Hippolyte Mège-Mouriès invents margarine, winning the prize offered by Napoleon III to invent a suitable substitute for butter. The original substitute however used beef suet rather than vegetable oils.
1886: Canada bans margarine.
1892: Experimental plantations of rice in Australia begin, in New South Wales.

20th century
1885-1904: Depending on claims, range for the invention of the modern hamburger.
1905: Stamen Grigorov discovered the Lactobacillus bulgaricus, the lactic acid-producing bacteria, which is the true cause for the existence of natural yogurt.
1920s: French fries introduced in the United States by returning First World War soldiers. 
1948: Canada lifts the ban on margarine.
1958: The instant noodle was invented by Momofuku Ando of Nissin Foods in Japan. They were launched the same year.
1960: The invention of the potato water gun knife facilitates the mass production of French fries by fast food restaurants.

21st century
In 2013, professor Mark Post at Maastricht University pioneered a proof-of-concept for cultured meat by creating the first hamburger patty grown directly from cells. Since then, other cultured meat prototypes have gained media attention: SuperMeat opened a farm-to-fork restaurant called "The Chicken"

See also

 Food history
 History of breakfast
 List of ancient dishes
 List of food and beverage museums

References

Further reading
 
 

food

History of food and drink